HNG may refer to:
Hengoed railway station, in Wales
Former Houston Natural Gas, US
Haji Namdar Group, a terrorist organisation in Pakistan
Hungary, ITU letter code